Sherilynn Black is an American neuroscientist, the Associate Vice Provost for Faculty Advancement, as well as an assistant professor of the Practice of Medical Education at Duke University in Durham, North Carolina. Black's research focuses on social neuroscience and developing interventions to promote diversity in academia. Black has been widely recognized for her commitment to faculty development and advancement and holds national appointments with the National Academy of Sciences, Engineering and Medicine, the National Institutes of Health, the Howard Hughes Medical Institute, the American Association of Medical Colleges, The Burroughs Wellcome Fund, and the Society for Neuroscience.

Early life and education 
Black pursued her undergraduate degree at the University of North Carolina at Chapel Hill. As a Morehead-Cain Scholar, Black majored in Psychology and minored in Biology. After graduating with highest honors, Black continued in academia and pursued graduate work at Duke University in Neurobiology. While completing her Ph.D., Black simultaneously studied education at UNC at Chapel Hill in the School of Education. In 2002, Black became the first African American graduate student to pass the qualifying exam necessary to complete graduate school.

Black completed her graduate training in 2008 and stayed at Duke for postdoctoral training in the lab of Dr. Kafui Dzirasa from 2009 until 2012. Under Dzirasa's mentorship, Black studied the cortical control of the neural circuits underlying emotion. Black found that optogenetic stimulation of cortical projection neurons had an antidepressant effect on mice, and through multi-region neural recordings, found that this stimulation drives synchronous neural activity across multiple limbic brain regions implicated in emotional regulation.

Career and research 
In 2010, the Office of Biomedical Graduate Diversity was established at Duke University, and Black was recruited as the first Director of the office. Black addressed issues such as imposter syndrome and the lack of role models for minority students by recruiting diverse students and faculty and beginning recruitment early in undergraduate degrees. Black created a multidisciplinary group and comprehensive program to begin to correct for the gender and racial disparities that exist at the level of graduate education. At the undergraduate level, Black ensured that students were given the opportunity to get involved in specialized programs geared towards pursuing graduate school and she ensured that faculty, even as senior as Department Chairs, were involved in recruitment at events and conferences. At the graduate level, Black oversaw the development of programs geared towards addressing the challenges that underrepresented students often face in academia. Black coordinated an annual retreat through the Office of Biomedical Graduate Diversity where all underrepresented graduate students have a chance to meet each other, develop friendships, and prepare for a successful Duke graduate school experience. Black's efforts led to double the number of applications to biomedical programs at Duke within the first 5 years, improved matriculation rates, and improved student funding rates through fellowships.

In 2012, Black was appointed to assistant professor of the Practice of Medical Education in the Ophthalmology and Clinical Science Department at Duke University. One year later, in 2013, she was promoted to assistant professor of the Practice of Medical Education in the Department of Medical Education within Duke's School of Medicine. During this time, she conducted research to identify common variables leading to success in higher education STEM student-development programs. She also developed computational models to predict the success of higher education programs. Black then became the co-Principal Investigator of the NIH-funded BioCoRE or the Duke Biosciences Collaborative for Research Engagement. In this role, Black promoted both graduate and undergraduate research and holistic development of biomedical scholars.

As of 2017, Black was promoted to Associate Vice Provost for Faculty Advancement. She serves as faculty affiliate for the Duke Center for Science Education, a member of the a President's Council on Black Affairs, a member of the Leadership Advisory Council on Underrepresented Minority Faculty, a member of the Advisory Council for Sexual and Gender Diversity, and the co-Advisor for the Duke Chapter of the Society for the Advancement of Chicanos and Native Americans in Science (SACNAS).

In 2023, Black was named co-chair of the National Academies of Science, Engineering, and Medicine (NASEM) Initiative, a new measure designed to better understand the "intersections between mentorship, professional development and well-being across academic career stages."

Awards and honors 
 2019 Inaugural Speaker for the National Institutes of Environmental Health Sciences (NIEHS) Diversity Speaker Series
 Duke AHEAD Fellow
 Deans Award for Inclusive Excellence in Graduate Education 
 2015 Samuel DuBois Cook Society Award
 Morehead-Cain Scholar

Appointments 
 Howard Hughes Medical Institute Gilliam Fellowship mentor
 National Academy of Sciences, Engineering and Medicine Committee Member
 American Association of Medical Colleges  - Ph.D. Outreach Committee
 The Burroughs Wellcome Fund
 Society for Neuroscience - Faculty in the Neuroscience Scholars Program and Member of the Professional Development Committee

Publications 
Kumar, Sunil, Sherilynn J. Black, Rainbo Hultman, Steven T. Szabo, Kristine D. DeMaio, Jeanette Du, Brittany M. Katz, Guoping Feng, Herbert E. Covington, and Kafui Dzirasa. “Cortical control of affective networks.” J Neurosci 33, no. 3 (January 16, 2013): 1116–29.

References

External links
 Sherilynn Black at Duke University School of Medicine

Living people
American women neuroscientists
Year of birth missing (living people)
Duke University faculty
University of North Carolina at Chapel Hill alumni
American neuroscientists
21st-century African-American women
21st-century African-American scientists
Scientists from North Carolina
Duke University alumni
21st-century American scientists
21st-century American women scientists
American academic administrators
African-American women academics
American women academics
African-American academics